N20 may refer to:

Roads 
 Route nationale 20, in France  
 N20 road (Ireland)
 Navajo Route 20, in Arizona, United States

Other uses 
 N20 (Long Island bus)
 BMW N20, an automobile engine
 EFW N-20, a Swiss jet fighter aircraft
 London Buses route N20
 Nitrogen-20, an isotope of nitrogen
 Toyota Hilux (N20), a Japanese pickup truck
 N20, a postcode district in the N postcode area

See also
 N2O (disambiguation), with a letter O in place of a zero
 20N (disambiguation)